The Very Best of Peter Allen is the first compilation album released by Australian singer-songwriter Peter Allen. It was released in July 1982 through A&M Records, completing his deal with the label. The album peaked at number nine on the Australian Kent Music Report. The album was re-titled, The Best in the United States, with an altered track listing.

Background 

The Very Best of Peter Allen is a compilation album by Australian-born singer-songwriter Peter Allen, which was issued in 1982. According to Australian musicologist, Ian McFarlane, Allen's most famous songs during his career were "I Go to Rio", "I Honestly Love You", "Don't Cry Out Loud" and "I Still Call Australia Home".

Reception

Track listing

The Very Best of Peter Allen Festival Records , A & M Records

Charts

Certifications

References

Peter Allen (musician) albums
1982 greatest hits albums
Compilation albums by Australian artists
Albums produced by David Foster
A&M Records albums
Albums produced by Mike Post